Southern Empire Records is a Metalcore record label began in 2004 by David Anthem, the lead singer of NC hardcore band, Prayer For Cleansing and ex-Undying bassist and roadie, Jonathan Raine and Chris Gannon. The label released the re-recorded Prayer for Cleansing EP, "The Tragedy", in the summer of 2004 just in time for the band's finale show at Hellfest in Elizabeth, NJ.

See also
 List of record labels

American record labels
Record labels established in 2004